Cytgan (Welsh for chorus) is a chamber choir whose members come from all over Wales and sing without a conductor. The Choir was established in 1999 while many of its members were in the National Youth Choir of Wales. The choir’s intention at the time was to ensure opportunities for its members to sing together all year round while continuing to develop their choral abilities and friendship. Since its inception Cytgan has gone from strength to strength, staging concerts around Wales and England, and has enjoyed considerable success in competitions. It is a regular competitor at Gŵyl Fawr Aberteifi, the annual Gŵyl Cerdd Dant and the National Eisteddfod of Wales. Cytgan won the youth choir competition at the National Eisteddfod at Meifod in 2003. The choir also brought the 2005 Llandeilo Music Festival to a close, and reached the final round of the S4C Cor Cymru 2005 mixed choir competition. The choir's CD, ‘Cytgan’, which was released by Fflach Records, has also been successful. The choir was also involved in the recording of Karl Jenkins latest CD, ‘Requiem’. Members of Cytgan have often been invited to participate in radio and television programmes.

The choir has been a part of the great resurgence in Wales for Choral singing over the last ten year. Following on from where Ysgol Gerdd Ceredigion and Ysgol Glanaethwy started, the choir is proud of its place in the new wave of Welsh choirs. In addition Cordydd, CF1, Côr Cyntaf i’r Felin, Bechgyn Bro Taf, Ar ol Tri, Bois y Castell, Cor Caerdydd, the Ardwyn and many others all contribute massively to both the social and musical life in Wales.

Choir Members
The members of the choir are:

Soprano: Elin Llwyd, Ceri Mears, Melissa Henry, Lowri Morris, Catrin Evans,
Alto: Elin Griffiths, Bethan Lloyd, Catrin Mears, Laura Davies, Laura Price, Ruth Leggett
Tenor: Gareth Evans, Rhys Davies, Iwan Griffiths
Bass: Elis Griffiths, Rhys Griffiths, David Leggett, Peter Leggett
Accompanist: Ruth Leggett

References

 "March 22 is the first chance music lovers in Cardiff will get to hear the chamber choir Cytgan. This unique choir, which performs without a conductor, ..."
 "Such choral excellence will be rivalled by the remarkable young Welsh choir Cytgan, who will bring the festival to a close after making such a memorable ..."
 "Choir under 25: 1, Ysgol Gerdd Ceredigion; 2, Cytgan, Cardiff; 3, Cor Glanaethwy, Bangor. Wilbert Lloyd Roberts, Memorial Scholarship: Elin Llwyd, Cardiff. ..."

Welsh choirs
Musical groups established in 1999
1999 establishments in Wales